is the former manager of Nippon Professional Baseball's Seibu Lions. He was the number 1 draft pick for the Seibu Lions in 1982 and went on to play for them until 2003. He was talented at leading pitcher, and led his team to winning 12 Pacific League championships and 10 Japan Series winners. After his retirement, he managed and led his team to the 2004 Japan Series championship.

On 30th October 2018, it was announced that Itō would be joining the Chunichi Dragons as head coach under new manager Tsuyoshi Yoda.

Career statistics

Titles and awards
Best Nine : 10 times (1985–1988, 1990–1992, 1997–1998, 2002)
Golden Glove : 11 times  (1985–1988, 1990–1992, 1994–1995, 1997–1998)
Commissioner's Award : (2003)
All Star appearance : 16 times (1984–1998, 2002)
305 sacrifice bunts in career (Pacific League record)

References

External links
 

1962 births
Living people
People from Kumamoto
Japanese Baseball Hall of Fame inductees
Japanese baseball players
Nippon Professional Baseball catchers
Seibu Lions players
Managers of baseball teams in Japan
Seibu Lions managers
Chiba Lotte Marines managers